Deena Metzger (born September 17, 1936) is an American writer, healer, and teacher whose work spans multiple genres including the novel, poetry, non-fiction, and plays.

Her novel La Negra y Blanca won the 2012 Oakland Pen Award for Literature. She first introduced and convened Daré, monthly gatherings for community and individual healing in 1999 and then ReVisioning Medicine in 2004. Metzger is known for her image in Hella Hammid's 1977 photograph, sometimes referred to as "The Warrior," or “Tree” poster, in which the post-mastectomy Metzger stands in a celebratory pose.

Early life

Deena Metzger was born in Brooklyn, New York in 1936 to Arnold and Bella Posy. Metzger credits her parents for raising her "in a rich and committed Yiddish cultural and spiritual life." As a child, Metzger aspired to write poetry and would often go on long walks along the beach in Sea Gate for inspiration. She first attended college in 1953 at Brandeis University and Brooklyn College in 1955. She became the co-editor for the Brooklyn College literary journal with Shela Pearl. During her time as an editor, she met Victor Perera (writer) and began a lifelong friendship with the fellow artist and activist. When Metzger was a teenager she promised herself she would finish her first novel by the age of 25, which she did, completing Waterwall in 1960, although this work was never published. She received an M.A. in English and American Literature from UCLA.  A Community College Teaching Certificate from UCLA in 1966.  She received a PhD in Literature and Women's Culture from International College in 1975.

Career

In May 1969, Metzger was teaching an English class at Los Angeles Valley College and was fired for “immoral conduct” and “evident unfitness to teach” when teaching a unit applying Supreme Court decisions regarding literature and pornography.  She subsequently brought the case to court and was reinstated in 1972. She also taught in the Critical Studies Department at the California Institute for the Arts from 1970 to 1975. There she taught the first class in journal writing.

From 1973 to 1978 she was the director of the writing program for the Woman's Building and the Feminist Studio Workshop in Los Angeles. The Woman's Building was the first feminist institution of higher learning outside of a university.

In 1972, she spent time in Chile and was part of a film collective that made an early media response, the film pamphlet, Chile with Poems and Guns, three months after the golpé. In 1999, she visited with Nganga, healer, Augustine Kandenwa in Zimbabwe and afterwards introduced Daré, healing community, to North America. From 2004 to the present,she has collaborated with everyday gandhis, a grassroots, peacebuilding NGO in Liberia.

In 1977 she discovered she had breast cancer, and had a mastectomy. Later, she was photographed by Hella Hammid for a poster that showed her naked from the waist up, with a tattoo covering the scar from her mastectomy. This became known as the “Tree Poster” or the Warrior Poster, also called "I Am No Longer Afraid". Deena writes:

“Our intention in turning it into a poster was to invite the world to look at a one-breasted woman and exult in her health and vitality. An alliance with the life force on all levels resulted from meeting the illness as a messenger – it called me to change my life in ways that would show themselves to be good for me and for the community.”
(See "Poster" below.)

Metzger and Theater Director, Steven Kent, recovered the ancient rites of the Eleusinian Mysteries and re-enacted them in Greece for the first time in 1,500 years in 1980. The inspiration came from producing the play ″Dreams Against the State″ which she wrote and Kent directed.

She was co-editor of "Intimate Nature: The Bond Between Women and Animals," with Linda Hogan and Brenda Peterson, a critical text on animal intelligence and agency, that speaks also to the profound knowledge that is gathered when relationships are intimate rather than alienated, or "objective." Her work with and on behalf of the animals, the non-humans, deepened when she met the Elephant Ambassador in Botswana, on six separate occasions from 1999 to 2017.

In 2004, her work as a healer took a new form when she initiated ReVisioning Medicine, an alliance between medical and medicine people to create a medicine that does no harm to humans or the earth. In 2009, she began teaching the 19 Ways to the 5th World. She is also on the Faculty of the Kerulos Center. The Deena Metzger Literature of Restoration Fellowship at Mesa Refuge was offered to novelist Stan Rusworth in 2015.

She currently lives in Topanga, California.

Professional experience 

From 1975-1995 Metzger worked in a private practice as a counselor. She continues her healing and creative work and consultations into the present with people individually and in groups. In April 1999, Metzger initiated the Blue Flag Daré for community, creativity, and healing. Metzger has also convened ReVisioning Medicine, a council that connects Western medical practitioners and indigenous healers to engage in a dialogue with the goal of reshaping how medicine is understood and practiced.  Literature of Restoration 2014 to present.  Deena Metzger Literature of Restoration residency at Mesa Refuge award to Stan Rushworth January 2015. "Extinction illness: Grave Affliction and Possibility, https://www.tikkun.org/extinction-illness-grave-affliction-and-possibility

Metzger is a creative writing teacher and feminist scholar. In the 1960s and 1970s Metzger was a member of the Critical Studies faculty at the California Institute of the Arts, taught English at Los Angeles Valley College, and was on the faculty of the Feminist Studio Worship. Metzger also founded the writing program at Woman's Building in Los Angeles. Metzger was a contributing editor to Chrysalis: A Magazine of Women's Culture that ran from 1977 to 1980 in Woman's Building.

Performed in 1980, 1990, and 1997, Metzger collaborated with Steve Kent, Michael Ortiz Hill, and Michelle George in their enactment of The Eleusinian Mysteries in Greece. This ritual had not been practiced in Greece for 1500 years.

Books 
 Skin:Shadows/Silence, a novel, West Coast Poetry Review, 1976.
 Dark Milk, poetry, Momentum Press, Los Angeles, 1978.
 The Axis Mundi Poems, Jazz Press, Santa Cruz, 1981, .
 Tree/The Woman Who Slept with Men to Take the War Out of Them, Peace Press, 1981. Reprinted, Wingbow Press, 1983.
 Looking For The Faces Of God, poetry, Parallax Press, Berkeley, 1989, .
 What Dinah Thought, a novel, Viking/Penguin, 1989, .
 A Sabbath Among The Ruins, poetry, Parallax press, 1992, .
 Writing For Your Life, A Guide And Companion To The Inner Worlds, Harper San Francisco 1992, Published in Italian as Scrivere Per Crescere, Astrolabio, 1992.
 Tree: Essays & Pieces, North Atlantic Books, 1997.  (updated/expanded from 1981/1983 editions) Published in Italian as LINFA in 1978, La Salamandra, Milano.
 Intimate Nature: The Bond Between Women & Animals, co-edited with Linda Hogan and Brenda Peterson, Ballantine Books, 1998. Paperback edition April 1999. 
 The Other Hand, Red Hen Press, 2000. 
 Entering the Ghost River: Meditations on the Theory and Practice of Healing, (non-fiction) Hand to Hand, 2001, 
 Doors: A Fiction For Jazz Horn, Red Hen Press, 2005, 
 From Grief into Vision: A Council, (non-fiction) Hand to Hand, 2006, 
 Ruin and Beauty: New and Selected Poems, Red Hen Press, 2009, 
 Feral, Hand to Hand, February, 2011, 
 La Negra y Blanca, A Novel, Hand to Hand, June, 2011, 
 A Rain of Night Birds, A Novel, Hand to Hand, April, 2017, ISBN 97-80998344300

Anthology publications
 The Awakened Warrior; ed. by Rick Fields
  A Casebook on Anais Nin, ed. by Robert Zaller
 Cradle and All, Women Writers on Pregnancy & Birth, ed. by Laura Chester
 Coming Into Our Fullness, Women Turning Forty by Cathleen Rountree; Deep Down
 New Sensory Writing by Women, ed. by Laura Chester
 Dharma Gaia, A Harvest of Essays in Buddhism and Ecology, ed. by Allan Hunt Badiner
 Erotic By Nature, ed. by David Steinberg
 Grand Passion, The Poets of Los Angeles and Beyond, ed. by Suzanne Lummis and Charles H. Webb
 Gridlock: An Anthology of poetry about Southern California, edited by Eliot Fried
 Hear the Silence, ed by Irene Zahava
 Her Soul Beneath the Bone: Women's Poetry on Breast Cancer, ed. by Leatrice Lifshitz
 Invocation L.A. Urban Multicultural Poetry, eds. Michelle T. Clinton, Sesshu Foster, Naomi Quinonez
 Love Stories by New Women, Charlene Swansea and Barbara Campbell
 Meeting the Shadow, ed. by Connie Zweig and Jeremiah Abrams
 Nourishing the Soul, ed. by Anne Simpkinson, Charles Simpkinson & Rose Solari
 Ordinary Magic, ed. by John Welwood
 Pleasures The Erotic Edge, Erotica For Couples and Erotic Interludes, ed. by Lonnie Barbach
 Prayers For a Thousand Years, edited by Elizabeth Roberts and Elias Amidon
 Recollections of Anais Nin by Her Contemporaries, ed. Benjamin Franklin V
 Rising Tides, ed. by Laura Chester and Sharon Barba
 The Soul of Nature, ed. by Michael Tobias and Georgianne Cowan
 The Soul Unearthed, ed. By Cass Adams
 Storming Heaven's Gate: An Anthology of Spiritual Writings by Women, ed by Amber Coverdale Sumrall and Patrice Vecchione
 Stories of the Spirit, Stories of the Heart, ed. by Christina Feldman and Jack Kornfield
 he Streets Inside: Ten Los Angeles Poets, ed. by Bill Mohr
 Stubborn Light, The Best of the Sun, Volume III, ed. By Sy Safransky
 To Be a Woman, ed. by Connie Zweig
 Touching Fire, eds. Louise Thornton, Jan Sturtevant & Amber Coverdale Sumrall
 Visionary Voices, ed. by Penny Rosenwasser
 The Well of Creativity interviews by Michael Toms with Hay House
 Word of Mouth, 150 Short-Short Stories by 99 Women Writers, ed. Irene Zahava
 Revamping the World, On the Return of the Holy Prostitute, first published by the Utne Review has been widely circulated and reprinted in dozens of journals.

Poster 

'Tree, the mastectomy poster,' has been widely circulated and has appeared in various film and television documentaries, journals and newspapers including The Village Voice, Revolution Nursing Journal, Common Ground, the Detroit Metro Times, Our Bodies Our Selves, Women's Spirit Source Book and was the cover of the Oklahoma County Medical Society, April, 90. This photograph is canonized in the body of art made by breast cancer survivors.

Photograph by Hella Hammid, words by Deena Metzger, poster design by Sheila Levrant de Bretteville. (Wingbow Press, 1989). 24"x17". Inscription reads:

Audiotapes 

 This Body/My Life, Sounds True
 The Book Of Hags, produced by KPFK for Pacifica and issued by Black Box.
 Breaking The Silence: Jewish Feminists Tell Their Stories, produced by Naomi Newman of the Traveling Jewish Theatre. From the Series Heart of Wisdom as broadcast on American Public Radio.
 The Creative Use of Imagination in Healing in Cancer As A Turning Point, Sounds True.

Drama, video and theatre productions 

 Co-writer and co-producer the hour-long documentary film Chile: With Poems and Guns, 1973.
 Writer associate of Barbara Myerhoff of the Department of Visual Anthropology at the University of Southern California on the cultural video gerontology project, Life Not Death In Venice.
 Barbara Myerhoff, (2007), Stories as Equipment for Living, edited by Marc Kaminsky, Deena Metzger, and Marc Weiss, with an Introduction by Thomas R. Cole, and a Foreword by Professor Jack Kugelmass, University of Michigan Press.
 Theatre production Not As Sleepwalkers directed by Jeremy Blahnik, Los Angeles 1977. Theatre production
 Dreams Against The State, directed by Steven Kent, [in private homes, churches, community houses,] Los Angeles 1981. Seven Stages, Atlanta 1986. La Verne University, CA, January 2005.
 Staged reading The Woman Who Slept With Men To Take The War Out Of Them Toronto and Montreal 1985.
 How Will I Survive: A Documentary about Breast Cancer, video, directed by Johanna Dematrakis, produced by Marc Harris, Goal Productions 1993.

Awards 

2012, PEN Oakland/Josephine Miles Literary Award for her novel, “La Negra y Blanca” published by Hand to Hand, 2011.

"Two Writers in a Friendship of Unabashed Exposure : Barbara Myerhoff and Deena Metzger," Lilith, Volume 25, No. 2, Summer 2000. Winner Simon rockower Award/ American Jewish Press Association, Excellence in Special Sections or Supplements Magazine, June 2001.

First annual Vesta Award in Writing, the Woman's Building, Los Angeles. 1982

Writing Fellowship the National Endowment for the Arts, 1978.

The first Academic Freedom Award, the California Federation of Teachers, 1975 after being reinstated by a unanimous decision of the Supreme Court of California to her tenured teaching position at Los Angeles Valley College from which Metzger had been fired in 1969. This decision was regarded as a significant victory for the cause of academic freedom.

References

External links 
 Deena Metzger Website 
 deenametzger.wordpress.com Deena Metzger's Blog

20th-century American novelists
21st-century American novelists
American women novelists
20th-century American poets
21st-century American poets
American women poets
American spiritual writers
American feminist writers
Jewish feminists
Jewish American novelists
Jewish American poets
Jewish women writers
Writers from Los Angeles
Activists from California
California Institute of the Arts faculty
University of California, Los Angeles alumni
Brooklyn College alumni
Brandeis University alumni
1936 births
Living people
American women essayists
20th-century American women writers
21st-century American women writers
PEN Oakland/Josephine Miles Literary Award winners
21st-century American essayists